Bouncing with Bud (also known as Bebop in Pastel) is a 1946 jazz standard by American jazz pianist Bud Powell and Gil Fuller, which features the saxophone of Sonny Stitt and the trumpet of Kenny Dorham. It was originally recorded on 23 August 1946 as "Bebop in Pastel",  In the key of B-flat major, the tune is a "nonblues theme whose form is A-A'-B-A' with an eight-bar interlude that is not played during the solos."

Powell played the theme under the debut title "Bouncing with Bud" on 9 August 1949 for Blue Note Records with Sonny Rollins, Fats Navarro, Tommy Potter and Roy Haynes, for a recording which is often wrongly thought to be the original. He recorded a trio version as the title tune of his 1962 Delmark album. Numerous other artists have covered it, including Hank Mobley with Donald Byrd for Prestige Records, Art Blakey and the Jazz Messengers on Paris Jam Session with Bud on piano, Charles McPherson Tokyo 1976 and pianist Keith Jarrett, as the opening track for his 1999 live album Whisper Not.

References

Songs about jazz
Songs about musicians
Cultural depictions of jazz musicians
1940s jazz standards
1946 songs
Compositions by Bud Powell
Jazz compositions in B-flat major